Keith Willows (born 29 April 1951) is a South African cricketer. He played in three first-class matches for Border from 1970/71 to 1972/73.

See also
 List of Border representative cricketers

References

External links
 

1951 births
Living people
South African cricketers
Border cricketers
Cricketers from East London, Eastern Cape